Malagò is an Italian surname. Notable people with the surname include:

Giovanni Malagò (born 1959), Italian businessman, sports manager, and futsal player
Marco Malagò (born 1978), Italian footballer

Italian-language surnames